There have been three leaders of Swaziland with the name Mswati.

 Chief Mswati I, c. 1480 – c. 1520
 King Mswati II, 1840–1868
 King Mswati III, since 1986

See also
List of monarchs of Eswatini